Fenouillet is a commune in the Pyrénées-Orientales department in southern France.

Geography 
Fenouillet is located in the canton of La Vallée de l'Agly and in the arrondissement of Perpignan.

Population

Sites of interest 
 The Château Vicomtal Saint-Pierre de Fenouillet is a ruined 11th century castle.

See also
Communes of the Pyrénées-Orientales department

References

Communes of Pyrénées-Orientales
Fenouillèdes